Kenturah Davis (born 1984) is a contemporary artist working between Los Angeles, New Haven and Accra, Ghana.

Education 
Davis earned her BA from Occidental College and a MFA from Yale University School of Art.

Career and Critical Reception 
Davis' work explores the relationship between identity, language, and figurative mark-making. Davis works in a range of media from drawing to painting to sculpture to performance. Her work is in the collection of the Walker Art Center.

In 2020, Davis collaborated with the fashion label: Osei Duro. Davis was commissioned by Los Angeles Metro to create large-scale work that will be permanently installed in a site-specific location on the new K Line (Crenshaw/LAX) rail line.

In 2021, the Pérez Art Museum Miami acquired their work Black As the Most Exquisite Color (2019) as part of this institution's new acquisitions initiative. Davis's work was welcomed into PAMM's collection alongside artworks from Bisa Butler, Tania Bruguera, and Coco Fusco, among others.     

In 2022, Ava DuVernay's portrait, by Davis, was revealed by the National Portrait Gallery.

Selected exhibits 
2013 "Sonder" at Papillion in Los Angeles

2019 "Blur in the Interest of Precision" at the Mathew Brown in Los Angeles

2020 "Everything that cannot be Known" at the SCAD Museum of Art in Georgia

References 

African-American women artists
African-American contemporary artists
American contemporary artists
Living people
Ghanaian women painters
Ghanaian women sculptors
21st-century Ghanaian sculptors
21st-century Ghanaian painters
21st-century women artists
1984 births
Occidental College alumni
Yale School of Art alumni
21st-century African-American people
21st-century African-American women